The Moderus Gamma is an articulated tram manufactured in Biskupice, Poland, since 2016 by , a subsidiary of transport operator MPK Poznań. Planning began in 2008 and the prototype was completed in 2016.

Variants
Multiple variants of the Gamma tram exist, are ordered or are under construction.
Gamma LF 02 AC (Poznań)
Gamma LF 03 AC BD (Poznań)
Gamma LF 06 AC (Łódź)
Gamma LF 07 AC (Wrocław)
Gamma LF 10 AC BD (Woltersdorf)

Technical specifications
They are fitted with IGBT transistors. The prototype was equipped with capacitors for storing the energy produced during regenerative braking.

Interior
The interior of the tram includes air conditioning, USB sockets and a passenger information system. The prototype has capacity for 244 passengers with 66 seats, including three folding seats. The uni-directional trams have a passenger capacity of 240 and the bi-directional sets have a passenger capacity of 233.

History
The tram was developed through a project called "Innovative City Tram," which was co-sponsored by the National Centre for Research and Development in Poland and the European Union. The prototype was finished in 2016 and presented at the manufacturer's factory in Poznań on 18 November 2016. In January 2017, MPK Poznań ordered 50 new Gamma trams: 30 uni-directional and 20 bi-directional sets. The prototype entered service in Poznań on 15 May 2017. Some Gamma LF02AC trams are stationed at the Franowo depot. Gamma trams are expected to replace second-hand German-built Type GT8 trams.

In October 2017, the Gamma tram began test runs on the Gdańsk tram system.

In March 2018, a contract for the delivery of ten single-section trams was signed by Tramwaje Śląskie and Modertrans. These trams will be based on the Gamma design. The first tram was delivered in April 2020. According to Urban Transport Magazine, these trams are classified as Moderus Beta MF 10 AC.

Five-section Gamma trams are scheduled to be delivered to Łódź in 2022. 30 sets were ordered by Łódź MPK in late 2019.

Three single-car Gamma LF 10 AC BD trams were ordered for the Woltersdorf Tramway, with deliveries scheduled for 2023.

Awards and distinctions
 2017 - Top Design Award 2017 in the Top Design 2017 competition in the Automotive and public transport category.
 2017 - award in the Rolling stock category in the competition Jan Podoski organized during the Trako fair.
 2017 - award in the Good Design 2017 competition in the Transport and Communication category.
 2019 - award in the Rolling stock category in the competition Jan Podoski organized during the Trako fair.

References

External links

 

Tram vehicles of Poland
Articulated vehicles
600 V DC multiple units